Catalina Larranaga (born November 27, 1969) is an American nutritionist, author, and former actress.

Bibliography 

 Gut Health Diet for Beginners: A 7-Day Plan to Heal Your Gut and Boost Digestive Health (as Kitty Martone), 2018, 
 The 4-Week Gut Health Plan: 75 Recipes to Help Restore Your Gut (as Kitty Martone), 2019, 
 Anti-Inflammatory Diet Instant Pot Cookbook: Easy Recipes to Reduce Inflammation (as Kitty Martone) with Charles Martone, 2021,

Selected filmography

References

External links
 Healthy Gut Girl - official website
 

Actresses from El Paso, Texas
American film actresses
Living people
21st-century American women
1969 births